Jan Beyzym, SJ (15 May 1850 – 2 October 1912) was a Polish Catholic priest and a professed member of the Jesuits. He served as an educator in Jesuit boarding schools for a while after his ordination though later left Poland to work alongside lepers in Madagascar where he remained until his death.

His beatification cause started in 1985 and in 1992 he was titled as Venerable, upon the confirmation of his life of heroic virtue. Pope John Paul II beatified him while in Poland on 18 August 2002.

Biography
Jan Beyzym was born in Stari Beizymy, Russian Empire (now Ukraine)  on 15 May 1850 as the eldest of five children to Jan Beyzym and Olga. His father served as a freedom fighter and in 1863 was sentenced to death in absentia for his activities. He moved alongside his mother and siblings to Kiev and studied there from 1864 until 1871.

He completed his education in Kiev before deciding to pursue the religious life; he had thought of being a diocesan priest but his late father had moved him to learn about the Jesuits and pursue a path with them - he decided to join them after a long internal struggle. Beyzym joined the Jesuits for his novitiate period on 10 December 1872 at Stara Wies and this concluded in 1874. During his novitiate there was a cholera epidemic and he received the permission of his superior to go out into the streets to tend to the ailing victims. Beyzym received his ordination as a priest on 26 July 1881 in Kraków from Bishop Albin Dunajewski.

He served as a teacher after his ordination until 1898 at Jesuit boarding schools in both Tarnopol and Chyrów where he taught the French and Russian languages. His students knew him for his sense of humor. In 1898 he left his native land to join the Jesuit missions to lepers near Tananariwa in Madagascar with the permission of his superiors. Father Beyzym left Poland on 17 October 1898 and arrived on the following 30 December at Red Island before being posted to Ambahivoraka near Antananarivo. He fainted several times while tending to the lepers due to the horrible smells. In October 1902 he began to see the construction of a leper hospital at Marana and it was finished and inaugurated on 16 August 1911. He became a noted figure for his activism and collaboration with the lepers and became known for his intense devotion to both the Eucharist and the Mother of God while being known also as a lover of all nature.

Beyzym died on 2 October 1912; his health had declined and he suffered both arteriosclerosis and sores which confined him to bed. His remains were exhumed and relocated back to his native Poland on 8 December 1993 at a Jesuit church.

Beatification

The beatification process opened in Kraków from 1984 until 1986 while a second diocesan process opened and closed in Fianarantsoa in 1987; the Congregation for the Causes of Saints later validated the processes on 27 October 1989. The official start to the process came on 27 September 1985 after the C.C.S. issued the official "nihil obstat" to the cause and titled her as a Servant of God. The C.C.S. later received the Positio in 1990. Theologians approved this on 28 April 1992 as did the C.C.S. on 3 November 1992; Pope John Paul II confirmed his life of heroic virtue and titled the late priest as Venerable on 21 December 1992.

John Paul II decreed that a healing credited to the late priest was a miracle on 5 July 2002 and beatified Beyzym two months later on 18 August 2002 while on an apostolic visit to Poland.

The current postulator for this cause is the Jesuit priest Anton Witwer.

References

External links
 Hagiography Circle
 Saints SQPN
 Holy See

1850 births
1912 deaths
19th-century venerated Christians
19th-century Polish Jesuits
20th-century venerated Christians
20th-century Polish Jesuits
Beatified Jesuits
Beatifications by Pope John Paul II
Jesuit missionaries in Madagascar
Leprosy nurses and caregivers
Leprosy activists
Polish Roman Catholic missionaries
Polish beatified people
Venerated Catholics by Pope John Paul II
Roman Catholic missionaries in Madagascar
Roman Catholic medical missionaries
Polish expatriates in Madagascar
Polish health activists